Portela or Pórtela may refer to:

People
 Portela (surname)

Places
 Lisbon Portela Airport, the international airport of Lisbon, Portugal
 Residence of Portela, 17th-century country house in Paços de Brandão, Portugal

Civil parishes
 Portela (Amares), a civil parish in the municipality of Amares, Portugal
 Portela (Arcos de Valdevez), a civil parish in the municipality of Arcos de Valdevez, Portugal
 Portela (Loures), a civil parish in the municipality of Loures (also known as Portela de Sacavém), Portugal
 Portela (Monção), a civil parish in the municipality of Monção, Portugal
 Portela (Penafiel), a civil parish in the municipality of Penafiel, Portugal
 Portela (Vila Nova de Famalicão), a civil parish in the municipality of Vila Nova de Famalicão, Portugal
 Portela Susã (Viana do Castelo), a civil parish in the municipality of Viana do Castelo, Portugal

Other uses
 Portela (samba school), a samba school in Brazil

Spanish-language surnames